The Bhagoria or Bhangoria Festival is celebrated by the tribal people of the Indian states of Madhya Pradesh and Maharashtra (originally known as 'Malwa'). Tribes who participate include the Bhil, Bhilala, and Pateliya.

The festival takes place in the Badwani, Dhar, Alirajpur, Khargone and Jhabua districts of Madhya Pradesh and Maharashtra. It has agricultural significance and coincides with the end of harvesting of crops. It is celebrated for seven days in the month of March before the Holi Festival. Traditionally, celebrants travel to the festival grounds with their families on decorated bullock carts. There they purchase the things required to celebrate Holi, dance to traditional musical instruments, sing songs called "Lokgeet" and enjoy meeting the people of the region.

References

Festivals in Madhya Pradesh
February events
March events